Truck stop is a previously best-selling German country band from Seevetal-Maschen, Harburg, south of Hamburg, that has been performing for over 40 years.

History 

Originally singing in English, the band converted to German in 1977 with its album Zuhause (Home), which sold 150,000 copies.  From this album, the single "Die Frau mit dem Gurt" reached number 27 on the German hit parade. Another song on the album, "Ich möchte so gern Dave Dudley hör’n" ("I Would Like So Much to Hear Dave Dudley"), reached number nine on the German single hit parade in April 1978. The band earned number one placement with the singles "Der wilde, wilde Westen" and "Old Texas Town" in 1980 and 1981.

In their 40 plus year tenure, the band have released at least eleven albums plus anniversary compilations, and dozens of singles.

References

External links 

 Official website in German
 Umfangreiche Biografie der Bandmitglieder auf country.de

German country music groups